Wila Quta (Aymara wila blood, blood-red, quta lake, "red lake", also spelled Huila Kkota) is a mountain in the Andes of Bolivia, about  high. It is situated in the La Paz Department, Larecaja Province, Sorata Municipality, north of the massif of Janq'u Uma and Illampu of the Cordillera Real. The river Janq'u Uma Jawira ("white water river", Anco Humu Jahuira) originates south of the mountain. It flows to the north-east.

See also 
 Llawi Imaña

References 

Mountains of La Paz Department (Bolivia)